FC Chabab was a Dutch amateur association football club from Amsterdam. After 42 years of independent existence, playing in the Dutch Hoofdklasse for the last completed season, they merged into a club from the city of Utrecht: SV Nieuw Utrecht.

FC Chabab was known for being a team mostly composed by players from the Moroccan community of Amsterdam. It was founded in 1983 by Moroccan immigrant guest workers and, after spending several years in the lower ranks of Dutch amateur football, was promoted to Topklasse in 2012 as playoff winners, under the guidance of former Moroccan international Alami Ahannach. It spent two seasons in the third Dutch tier before being relegated back to Hoofdklasse in 2013–14.

Current squad 
As of 1 February 2014

References 

Football clubs in the Netherlands
Football clubs in Amsterdam
Association football clubs established in 1983
1983 establishments in the Netherlands